Fetisch is the debut album by German post-punk band Xmal Deutschland, released in April 1983 on the 4AD label.

Critical reception

Track listing

Personnel
Musicians
 Vocals: Anja Huwe
 Guitars: Manuela Rickers
 Keyboards: Fiona Sangster
 Bass: Wolfgang Ellerbrock
 Drums: Manuela Zwingmann

Production
 Produced by Ivo Watts-Russell and Xmal Deutschland
 Engineered by John Fryer
 Design by 23 Envelope

References

1983 debut albums
Xmal Deutschland albums
4AD albums